The Luan Gallery is a publicly owned art gallery in Athlone, Westmeath, Ireland.

The gallery opened in 2012, and the building consists of the older part, a former public library built in 1897 as a temperance hall, combined with a newer wing, designed by Keith Williams. The building was named Best Cultural Building of 2013 by the RIAI, and received a Civic Trust Award in 2014.

The gallery takes its name from Luan son of Lugair son of Lugaid, a mythical chief who gives his name to the town.

References

External links
 Gallery website

Culture in Athlone
Art museums and galleries in the Republic of Ireland
Irish art
Art museums established in 2012
2012 establishments in Ireland
Recipients of Civic Trust Awards